Jesse A. Quatse (April 4, 1908 – December 26, 1977) was an American football offensive tackle in the National Football League for the Green Bay Packers, Pittsburgh Pirates, and the New York Giants. In 1927, he coached the Pittsburgh Americans of the second American Football League. He had also played in the second AFL the year prior for the New York Yankees. Prior to his professional career, Quatse played college football at the University of Pittsburgh.

References

External links

1908 births
1977 deaths
American football tackles
Green Bay Packers players
New York Giants players
New York Yankees (1936 AFL) players
Pittsburgh Panthers football players
Pittsburgh Pirates (football) players
All-American college football players
People from Westmoreland County, Pennsylvania
Players of American football from Pennsylvania
Sportspeople from the Pittsburgh metropolitan area